The 1986 USA Outdoor Track and Field Championships took place between June 20–21 at Hayward Field on the campus of University of Oregon in Eugene, Oregon. The meet was organized by The Athletics Congress.

Results

Men track events

Men field events

Women track events

Women field events

See also
United States Olympic Trials (track and field)

References

 Results from T&FN
 results

USA Outdoor Track and Field Championships
Usa Outdoor Track And Field Championships, 1986
Track and field
Track and field in Oregon
USA Outdoor Track and Field Championships
Outdoor Track and Field Championships